The 2018 Belk Bowl was a college football bowl game played on December 29, 2018. It was the 17th edition of the Belk Bowl, and one of the 2018–19 bowl games concluding the 2018 FBS football season. The game was sponsored by the department store chain Belk. With the bowl contested by two nearby public universities, attendance to the game increased by some 15,000 spectators over the previous year and had its highest attendance total since 2011.

Virginia shut out South Carolina, 28–0. This was the largest margin of victory in the history of the Belk Bowl. With the victory, the Virginia Cavaliers became the winningest team all-time in the Belk Bowl, and improved their record in Bank of America Stadium to 3–0 after winning the first two editions of the bowl in 2002 and 2003.

Teams
The game was played between South Carolina from the Southeastern Conference (SEC) and Virginia from the Atlantic Coast Conference (ACC). In prior games between the two programs, South Carolina held a 21–13–1 lead in the series.

South Carolina Gamecocks

South Carolina received and accepted a bid to the Belk Bowl on December 2. The Gamecocks entered the bowl with a 7–5 record (4–4 in conference).

Virginia Cavaliers

Virginia received and accepted a bid to the Belk Bowl on December 2. The Cavaliers entered the bowl with a 7–5 record (4–4 in conference).

Game summary

Scoring summary

Statistics

References

External links

Box score at ESPN

Belk Bowl
Duke's Mayo Bowl
South Carolina Gamecocks football bowl games
Virginia Cavaliers football bowl games
Belk Bowl
Belk Bowl